Alone is the debut album from bassist Evan Brewer of The Faceless and Animosity, the album features only bass guitar sounds. The Artwork was made by the Colombian drummer and graphic designer Mauro Mazuera.

Track listing

Personnel
Evan Brewer
Evan Brewer - Bass, Mixing, Mastering

2011 debut albums